Dasylophia seriata, the western legume prominent, is a species of moth in the family Notodontidae (the prominents). It was first described by Druce in 1887 and it is found in North America.

The MONA or Hodges number for Dasylophia seriata is 7959.

References

Further reading

 
 
 

Notodontidae
Articles created by Qbugbot
Moths described in 1887